Omar aga was a military leader of the Tatars in what is today Ukraine.

As an elderly man, in 1643 he was a leader on the expedition on estates of Prince Jeremi Wiśniowiecki. When he was returning to Crimea, he was attacked and defeated by Wiśniowiecki at the Sula River.

His two sons accompanied him on the expedition. The older son, Bajraz Kazi, died a few days after the battle due to injuries.

Footnotes

Bibliography 

Tatar people
17th-century Asian people